Idol Producer, is a 2018 Chinese reality boy group survival show, which premiered on January 19, 2018 on iQIYI. It is presented by Lay Zhang with Li Ronghao, Jackson Wang, MC Jin, Cheng Xiao and Zhou Jieqiong serving as mentors. On April 6, 2018, the nine highest ranked contestants debuted as Nine Percent.

Concept 
In 2017, Idol Producer took 100 out of 1908 trainees from 87 entertainment agencies all over Asia, which represented their companies and 8 of whom were independent trainees. The trainees were evaluated multiple times throughout the show by the audience's votes with trainees being eliminated. In the final episode, the nine most-voted-on trainees got to debut as a boy group and were set to promote for 18 months; The voting system is similar to those of South Korean reality television shows Produce 101 and Mix Nine.

Coaches 

 Lay Zhang — Production director/mentor
 Li Ronghao — Vocal mentor
 Jackson Wang — Rap mentor
 MC Jin — Rap mentor
 Cheng Xiao — Dance mentor
 Zhou Jieqiong — Dance mentor

Episodes

Episode 1 (January 19) 
Contestants choose stickers from A to F as a self-assessment to grade themselves. The contestants enter the studio, where 100 seats are arranged in a pyramid with a chair for the #1 trainee at the top. They are introduced by their label and choose seats from 1 to 100. The contestants then give performances for the judges, grouped by agency. The judges then re-assign the trainees a grade based on their overall performance, with A being the highest and F the lowest.

Episode 2 (January 26) 
The eating for the first round is unveiled while the grading sessions for trainees continue. After receiving their initial grade, Zhang Yixing (Lay) announces that the trainees must together perform the show's titular single "Ei Ei" with only three days for preparation. Trainees will have a stand-alone performance that is filmed only once. The coaches give a re-evaluation prior to the filming of the performance to reassign the trainees to another A-F grade. The trainees are then rearranged according to their newly reassigned grade.

Episode 3 (February 2) 
Training to perform the show's title song "Ei Ei" begins. After three days, the trainees are filmed performing the title song and are reevaluated by the judges. The B, C, D, and F grade trainees vote to select the center of the entire group, settling on individual trainee Cai Xukun, who narrowly defeats trainee Zhu Zhengting by two votes.  Trainees with an F grade after the reevaluation are denied the right to perform and must watch the performance as spectators. However, before the performance begins, the judges decide to let some of the particularly hard-working F grade trainees perform.

After recording "Ei Ei", it is revealed that for the second challenge, the trainees will be put into 16 teams to perform 8 songs. Two teams will be performing and competing against each other for each of the 8 songs: Jay Chou's "半兽人 (The Orcs)", "PPAP", Jolin Tsai's "大艺术家 (The Great Artist)", "Dance to the Music", "代号魂斗罗", Zhang Yixing's "Shake", CNBLUE's "Can't Stop", and "Get Ugly". Cai Xukun, because he was the center for the title song "Ei Ei", is allowed to choose his team's members and song first. The members of the winning team for each song will automatically receive 10,000 votes. The judges also announce that half of the trainees will be eliminated from the show following the second challenge. The two "半兽人 (The Orcs)" teams' performance, with the B team beating the A team.

Color key
 Center
 Winning Team

Episode 4 (February 9) 
The remaining 14 teams' performances are shown. Footage of each team practicing was shown before their respective performances. After the performance of each pair of groups, the live audience is given the opportunity to vote for their favorite member out of both of the competing teams. Individual votes were added up for an overall team score, and 10,000 votes were given to each member of the winning team for each song. Taiwanese trainee Chen Linong of "The Great Artist" team A won the most votes overall, with 10,000 bonus votes added to his 210 live audience votes. Zhang Yixing announces that the 39 trainees with the fewest votes (ranking 61-96) will be eliminated next week. The votes from this week's live performance will be added to the online votes to determine the top 60 trainees.

Episode 5 (February 16) 
The top 60 trainees with the most votes are announced, starting from rank 59 and announced in groups of ten. After every group of ten, clips of the trainees participating in various activities are shown. Polls among the trainees for the "best visual" and "the person I would most want to introduce to my little sister" were conducted. Taiwanese trainee Lin Yanjun is voted as "best visual" by his fellow trainees. The trainees race against each other to claim presents for the Chinese New Year. The trainees also do a dance battle, dancing to "Ei Ei" at various speeds. Judges Cheng Xiao and Zhou Jieqiong select the winners of the dance battle, who ask that their reward be to let the entire group of trainees go eat Haidilao Hot Pot, a request which the director grants.

Out of the top 9 trainees from voting, ranks 1-7 remain in the same position as last week's episode. Cai Xukun remains as rank 1 with a landslide victory of around 4 million votes against Chen Linong. Liang Hui is revealed to be rank 60, saving himself from elimination by a few thousand votes, demonstrating the importance of the 10,000 bonus votes that were awarded to the winning teams in last week's episode. The eliminated trainees leave quietly after saying goodbye early the next morning.

Episode 6 (February 23) 
The trainees begin their position evaluation group performances, with trainees selecting songs that can showcase their specialties in the vocal, dance, or rap categories. There are five songs for the vocal category: (Ed Sheeran's "Shape of You", Stefanie Sun's《我怀念的》(What I Miss), Chen Li's 《小半》(Little Half), Kimberley Chen's 《爱你》 (Love You), and "Always Online" by JJ Lin); four songs for the dance category ("Me Too", "Sheep" by Zhang Yixing, "Flow" by Khalil Fong ft. Wang Leehom, and Jay Chou's《双节棍》(Nunchuks)); and four songs for the rap category ("Very Good", "Turn Down for What", "Artist" by Zico and Papillon by Jackson Wang). The trainees with higher rankings pick their songs first, and once the chosen song reaches its member limit, the later trainees can no longer pick that song. The trainees' accumulated votes are reset to zero for this third challenge. The most possible votes that a trainee could earn from this challenge is 150,000, with the winning members of each winning group gaining 50,000 votes, and an extra 100,000 votes to the winning trainee in each category. The trainees from rank 36-60 after the second round of online voting at the end of this challenge will be eliminated.

Judges Jackson Wang and MC Jin provide mentorship to the trainees in an informal Q&A session. The trainees pick their songs in order of rank. Grouped by songs, the trainees in each group choose a center and a leader. Judges Cheng Xiao and Zhou Jieqiong provide dance advice. Trainee and Leader of "Nunchucks" Zhou Yanchen, who has been practicing late into the night, collapses at the end of the dress rehearsal due to hypoglycemia. The "《双节棍》(Nunchucks)", "Artist", "《我怀念的》(What I Miss)", and "Turn Down for What" groups perform, and their rehearsal experiences are shown. The "Papillon" group prepares to perform.

Color key
 Center
 Leader
 Leader and Center
 Top of the Category

Episode 7 (March 2) 
The trainees continue the position evaluation group performances with "Sheep" (Dance, Lay), "Loving You" (Vocal, Kimberley Chen), "Very Good" (Rap), and "Flow" (Dance), in which Center Zhu Yunyi suffered an eye injury during dance rehearsal at midnight of the live performance when his belt hit his right contact lens and temporarily blinded him due to hyphema. He had to stay in the green room during the performance, while his twin brother Zhu Yuntian and his teammates performed without him. Zhu Yuntian ended up getting first. "Little Half/Xiao Ban" (Vocal, Chen Li) Team, "Me Too" (Dance, Meaghan Trainor, composed of lower-ranked vocalists) also performed. The winners of each performance and the winners of each category are revealed.

Color Key
 Top of Each Category
 Top of Each Group

Episode 8 (March 9) 
The day after the Position Evaluations, Zhang Yixing provides his own Q&A session and shared his own experiences as a trainee, and how his agency's system differs from Idol Producer's system, like a 3-hour-only hire on practice rooms where you must sign for time slots, and the meals must be pre-ordered in the SM cafeteria. He also shared a change in mentality after debut. A day later, he revealed via video conference call that the next mission is the Concept Evaluation, where the trainees, as chosen by Idol Producers, will become the original singers to 5 original songs of different styles and concepts. However, the elimination to top 35 will occur midway through the preparation, meaning the final number of each group will be 5 groups of 7 (from 12). If a team is somehow wiped out after the midpoint cuts, the team will be rearranged in later episodes. The voting system also changes. First, the live audience pick the team that performs the best, then from that winning team, the trainee who performs the best will be picked. Each member of the winning team gains a pool of 500,000 votes, of which, the trainee that is the best of the best gets an extra 200000 votes, while the rest gain 50000 each. The five songs are "Firewalking" (Tropical House with chair dances), "Boom Boom Boom" (R&B), "Listen to What I Say (听听我说的吧)" (Hip hop), "I Will Always Remember (我永远记得)" (Pop ballad with soul), and Dream (Hip hop with dance points). In the initial stage, the group of 12 is split into 2 groups of 6, with 2 temporary centers and a temporary leader. Zhu Yunyi has recovered from hyphema, and  Zhou Yanchen has recovered from fainting from hypoglycemia for the practices for the new missions. On the morning of the reveal of the top 35, they write their final diary entries, which also serve as letters of gratitude to the mentors. Due to the longer voting periods including bonus votes added, over 255 million votes were received. He Dongdong plummets from 9th to 33rd over the last 3 weeks of voting, but still gained over 1.7 million votes. Cai Xukun retained his no.1 spot, while Li Junyi unofficially released his self-written song "The Greatest Dream" before he was eliminated.

Color Key
 Center
 Leader
 Leader and Center

Episode 9 (March 16) 
After the top 35 were revealed, the teams within each song are readjusted. At the end of this evaluation, the top 20 trainees will enter the final evaluation to determine the Final 9 members that would debut. The team members for the Concept evaluations are being readjusted. Conversely, The "Firewalking" group had to drop 3 people (from 10 people remaining), the "Dream" team must drop 4 members (from 11), "Boom Boom Boom" group will add 2 people (from the 5 remaining). I Will Always Remember group has to add one person (from the 6 remaining members) from the pool of eliminated members from the 'excess' group. The group with excess members must conduct internal voting to determine the members that would be waived off. The members least suitable to perform the original song would be released, then would be picked as free agents from the team needing to add members. Since "Listen to What I Have to Say" Group was decimated by the latest round of eliminations, with only three of the original 12 members left in the group, it added extra burden and frustration on leader Bu Fan because the original members' choreography and singing parts also needed to change with the adjustments. In the Firewalking group, Yue Yue and Qin Fen, being the oldest members in the original group, have suffered lower back issues, and are at risk of being waived, which they did. The risk of being in free agency is the same as the group with few original members, they must completely relearn a different song from scratch with less time.

For the team that needs to gain free agents, the team member with the highest individual rankings get higher picks to pick all members from the pool, which would be Xiao Gui (6th as of week 7) picking 4 members, You Zhangjing (8th) would pick a member, with the rest moving to "Boom Boom Boom" group by default.

The live voting system: Each audience has two votes. After all of the songs are performed, One for the team that performs the best, the other is for the team member from that group that is 'best of the best'. with both votes must be towards the same team. The team members of the best team will add a pool of 500,000 votes, and the best member will get 200,000 of the 500,000 votes, with the rest get an equal share of 50,000 votes. After all of the performances were complete, the top two trainees from the top 2 group are left unrevealed, which were Justin vs. Cai Xukun again. Their result won't be revealed until the 3rd ranking announcement, which would also be the elimination to the Top 20.

Color Key
 Center
 Leader
 Leader and Center
 Moved Into the Group

Episode 10 (March 23) 
Before the Top 20 announcements, the mentors all wrote a letter to the trainees, expressing their thoughts. This is the third and final ranking announcement, with the top 5 spots remaining the same from the previous elimination round.

The Top 20 would have 18 days (on April 6, 2018) to prepare the live broadcast, which is the final episode to determine the 9 members of the new boy group. The voting will include internet votes before voting plus the live voting on the night of the live broadcast. There would be two songs: "It's OK" (Pop) and Mack Daddy (Hip Hop). Unlike other "drafts", the trainees with the lowest rankings get first pick to choose the song AND their preferred role, but the trainees in the higher ranks can knock the member occupying the preferred role off the spot, but can only be done once.

The third and final round of elimination occurs, with the trainees ranked 21-35 leaving the show, but only after the collaboration stages with the mentors, which is screened in episode 11. Cai Xukun retains his top position, with Zheng Ruibin being ranked as 20th. Zhou Yanchen, as 21st, is unfortunately eliminated.

Clips of trainees participating in various activities are also screened in this episode, such as playing musical chairs wearing inflatable suits. 
They also devise a ghost prank behind a two-way mirror, which frightens several trainees but fails at some. Another segment involves them being given the opportunity to 吐槽，or to expose other trainees in their daily life, such as Wang Ziyi's "Hey bro."

Episode 11 (March 30) 

Before the new set of evaluation, special guest instructor Jolin Tsai gave the remaining contestants some advice on facing criticisms and comments, especially from social media (primarily Weibo), and self evaluation and reflection.

This episode showcases the collaboration stage of the trainees with the mentors. The top 9 of the previous eliminations get to pick the song of the choice in order, and the remaining trainees have to draw lots for their order to pick the songs of their choice. The mentors then play a prank on the trainees in which they go into classrooms meant for other mentors, and causes a lot of excitement and confusion amongst the trainees. 
Eventually they get started on practising the songs with the mentors, which culminates in a showcase.

Each group is shown with their self introduction, then their behind-the-scenes practices, followed by their actual on-stage performance.

The 20 trainees are then given their last evaluation songs, "It's Ok" and "Mack Daddy", and they make their choices of song and position.

Episode 12 (April 6) 

The final episode is also a live broadcast, in which clips of the trainees picking out their songs, center position, and practices are interspersed with the events happening at the live showcase. 
The episode starts with the trainees at individual interviews, which they're given the plastic chairs with the ranking labels they each chosen to sit on in the first episode, and it triggers nostalgic memories within the trainees. They're also asked about what if they don't manage to debut.

The live broadcast is now shown, with all 99 trainees returning to perform "Ei Ei" live. Individual trainee Zhou Rui, invited by Zhang Yixing, introduces each company and their representatives. 
The group name of the debuting group is announced to be "Nine Percent", which represents the top 9 out of 100 trainees carrying forward the dreams of all the trainees with 100% of their effort, hence the name 9%.

After the mentors' introductions, the broadcast cuts to the selection of "It's Ok"'s center position. The selection process is done by the group performing the chorus, with each trainee taking the role of center once, then a closed voting process within the members of that group. 
The top 2 choices for "It's Ok" were Lin Chaoze and Lin Yanjun. As the center is due to be announced, the video cuts back to the broadcast, where "It's Ok"'s performers appear onstage, and Lin Yanjun is revealed as the center of the song.

"Mack Daddy" goes through the same process, where the top 2 choices were Cai Xukun and Fan Chengcheng. Cai Xukun is revealed to be the center.

Color Key
 Final Members of 9 Percent

In another clip, the 20 trainees also dress in the clothes they've worn for their first self-introduction, and speak in reminiscence of what they've said during that introduction, and express their thoughts.

Following that in the live broadcast, is a performance of a special song, titled "Forever", depicting the wishes of the trainees to stay like they once were, and as a thank-you to the fans for their support.

The trainees are shown invited individually into a dark room standing in front of a mirror, where they're asked to talk to their reflections in the mirror about their feelings. The lights are then turned off, which throws the scene into a humorous one as the trainees get paranoid about the situation being another ghost prank, with varied amusing reactions. However, this time video messages are screened on the surface of the mirror from the trainees' families to them, which causes a few to break down in tears.

The announcement of the top 9 takes up about 1 hour and 15 mins of the 3-hour long broadcast. 
As usual, the rankings are announced from the top 8 to 1, and each trainee walks from one end of the long stage to the main stage to take their seat, and present a short speech of thanks. The top 4 positions remained unchanged from the previous week, with You Zhangjing coming in as 9th place, taking the last position of the debuting group, Nine Percent.

The trainees then visit places in their dorm they've been to for the last time, including the dorm rooms, laundry room, makeup room, and more hilariously, the toilets. They talk about the memories they've had in the past four months of training, and finally clap the slate a final time. Memories of the past 12 episodes are shown, and the episode returns to the broadcast, where Zhang Yixing thanks everyone and wraps up Idol Producer.

Contestants 

Color key

Top 9

Elimination chart

Color key

Production 
Idol Producer is jointly created and produced by iQIYI and Beijing Caviar Communications, a television production start-up founded and headed by ex-HBS employee-turned-executive Lei Ying.

Chief producer Jiang Bin has previously produced many well known reality talent shows including S-style Show, I Supermodel and Road to the Runway. The show recruited Cheng Gang, the chief director of Super Boy and Tan Yan, the visual director of I Am a Singer.

The coaches for the series were introduced through posters, which were uploaded online. On December 17, 2017, a press conference was held where coaches Lay Zhang, Jackson Wang, Cheng Xiao, Zhou Jieqiong and MC Jin attended. On February 3, 2018, a total of 21 contestants were invited by Lay Zhang to guest star on Chinese variety show, Happy Camp.

Reception 
The first episode of the show garnered over 100 million viewers within the first hour of broadcast on iQiyi. Lay Zhang was remarked for his scrutiny towards the contestants during their performances.

Discography

Singles

Controversy

Copyright 
The show has been accused of plagiarizing the format of South Korean talent show Produce 101. The head of formats and development at Mnet, Jin Woo Hwang claimed that “People in our company were shocked because it wasn’t just a similar show – it was almost a duplicate show.”

The Format Recognition and Protection Association revealed results of its comparative analysis of “Idol Producer,” launched by China’s iQiyi in January 2018 and South Korean company CJ E&M, the production company of “Produce 101”, which launched in 2016. The analysis concluded that the Chinese show scored 88% on FRAPA’s scale of infringement when compared with the Korean show – it was the highest score ever recorded for an alleged infringement.

Misconduct 
Individual trainee Song Shuijiao was forced to leave Idol Producer due to verbal misconduct degrading women widespread over the internet. The trainee participated in the filming of the first episode, but was subsequently edited out prior to the broadcast.

Young Culture's Qian Zhenghao was found to have violated dormitory regulations by eating hot pot in the dormitory late at night. A handwritten letter of apology was posted on the official Idol Producer dormitory Sina Weibo account.

Two of MERCURY NATION'S trainees, GIGEL and Wang Youchen, were removed from the show as disciplinary action for ground fighting in the dormitory.

Notes

References

External links
  
 Idol Producer at iQIYI
 

Idol Producer
IQIYI original programming
2010s Chinese television series
2018 Chinese television series debuts
2018 Chinese television series endings
2018 in Chinese music
Mandopop
Mandarin-language television shows
Chinese reality television series
Chinese music television series
Lists of Chinese television series episodes
Chinese television shows
Singing talent shows
Television shows involved in plagiarism controversies